Holly Ward is an interdisciplinary artist based in Vancouver, BC. Ward's work utilizes sculpture, multi-media installation, drawing and architecture to explore the role of aesthetics in creating social realities.

Life 
Ward obtained a BA in English from the University of New Brunswick in 1995 and went on to obtain a BFA, Interdisciplinary from the Nova Scotia College of Art and Design in 1999. In 2006, Ward completed her MFA, Studio at the University of Guelph.

Artistic practice 
Ward has participated in group exhibitions in Canada, England, Mexico, the United States, Norway and South Korea and has shown seven solo exhibitions, the last being in 2009. Ward's first solo exhibition, More Softer Please, took place at the Helen Pitt Gallery, Vancouver, BC in 2000.  In 2009, Ward's work, Island, was included in the Vancouver Art Gallery's exhibition, How Soon Is Now. Island consisted of a large pile of soil that was moved by volunteers to different parts of the gallery during the show. Vancouver Art Gallery curator, Kathleen Ritter said of Island, "it's a playfully irreverent work and it challenged our conventional notions of the art object being static, by making something that has an almost parasitical relationship with the other works in the exhibition."  In 2018, a new installation by Ward, Raw Goods, was shown at the Polygon Gallery in Vancouver as part of their inaugural exhibition, N.Vancouver. The work consisted of "two wide, cone-like piles - one coal, one sulphur. Both commodities are integral to the local economy, and the sulphur's bright yellow is a familiar sight for anyone who has spent time on the Stanley Park seawall across the Inlet." In 2016, Ward's work Industry is Useless Without Culture: REsource Extraction #1-3 was acquired by the Vancouver Art Gallery for its permanent collection.

Collaboration 
Ward is a long-time collaborator with Vancouver artist, Kevin Schmidt. The pair collaborated on Schmidt's EDM House (2013), The Pavilion, Phase 2 (2011–), an architectural hybrid that is also the pair's home, and Screen in the Landscape (2015–).

Select solo exhibitions 
 2017, Holly Ward: Planned Peasanthood, Kamloops Art Gallery, Kamloops, BC
2009, Here & There, Republic Gallery, Vancouver, BC
 2008, Radical Rupture, Morris and Helen Belkin Gallery, Vancouver, BC
 2004-2005, The Future Is Now, L’Oeil de Poisson, Quebec, PQ, Or Gallery, Vancouver, BC, YYZ Artist’s Outlet, Toronto, ON

Select group exhibitions 
 2019, Displacement, Vancouver Art Gallery, Vancouver, BC
2018, N.Vancouver, Polygon Gallery, Vancouver, BC
2012, An Era of Discontent: Art as Occupation, Kamloops Art Gallery, Kamloops, BC
 2010, Invitation to an Infiltration, Contemporary Art Gallery, Vancouver, BC
 2009, How Soon Is Now, Vancouver Art Gallery, Vancouver, BC
 2008, The Sound I’m Looking For, Part 2, Charles H. Scott Gallery, Vancouver, BC
2007, Gasoline Rainbows, Contemporary Art Gallery, Vancouver, BC
2006, Until Then Then, Western Front, Vancouver, BC

References 

Year of birth missing (living people)
Living people
Canadian women artists
Interdisciplinary artists
21st-century Canadian artists
University of New Brunswick alumni
NSCAD University alumni